Louis Powell Harvey (July 22, 1820 – April 19, 1862) was an American politician and the seventh Governor of Wisconsin. He was the first Wisconsin Governor to die in office.

Early life
Harvey was born in East Haddam, Connecticut, and moved with his family to Ohio in 1828.  He attended Western Reserve College and Preparatory School. He worked as a teacher for a time, and eventually moved to Kenosha, Wisconsin, then named Southport, where he founded an academy. In Southport he associated with the Whig Party and edited a Whig newspaper, the Southport American (1843–1846). Lewis entered into correspondence 
with a local society called the "Boannergians," in the Summer of 1841 at Western Reserve College in Hudson, Ohio and it became a chapter of Beta Theta Pi on August 9, 1841.

Career
In 1847, Harvey married Cordelia Perrine and they moved to Clinton in Rock County, Wisconsin, then to the nearby hamlet of Shopiere. He helped organize the Republican Party and was a Republican member of the Wisconsin State Senate from 1854 to 1858, Wisconsin Secretary of State from 1860 to 1862, and finally Wisconsin's governor in 1862.

In April 1862, having served only a few months as governor, Harvey organized an expedition to bring medical supplies to Wisconsin troops, wounded in the Battle of Shiloh, who were being cared for in hospital boats on the Mississippi and Tennessee Rivers. Harvey visited and cheered troops at Cairo, Illinois, Mound City, Illinois, and Paducah, Kentucky.

Death

On April 19, 1862, close to Shiloh, Harvey stopped overnight near Savannah, Tennessee. Late that evening, while trying to step from a tethered boat to a moving steamboat headed back north (a common but dangerous practice), Harvey fell into the Tennessee River and drowned, despite the strenuous rescue efforts of members of his party.

His body was found 14 days later, 65 miles downstream near Britt's Landing; his remains lay in state in the Wisconsin State Capitol, and he was buried in Forest Hill Cemetery, in Madison. His wife Cordelia became a leading war nurse, honored with the rank of colonel by Abraham Lincoln. She subsequently established veterans hospitals in Wisconsin, away from the war front, and a soldiers' orphans home. She is interred at Forest Hill Cemetery, Madison, Wisconsin.

Lieutenant Governor Edward Salomon succeeded Harvey.

Electoral history

| colspan="6" style="text-align:center;background-color: #e9e9e9;"| General Election, November 5, 1861

References

External links
 Capsule biography - Wisconsin Historical Society
 Louis Powell Harvey bio - Second Wisconsin Volunteer Infantry website, from Military History of Wisconsin (1866)
 Governor Louis Harvey, Wisconsin State Historical Society
 

1820 births
1862 deaths
Governors of Wisconsin
People from East Haddam, Connecticut
Politicians from Kenosha, Wisconsin
People of Wisconsin in the American Civil War
American educators
19th-century American newspaper editors
Editors of Wisconsin newspapers
Wisconsin state senators
Accidental deaths in Tennessee
Deaths by drowning in the United States
Secretaries of State of Wisconsin
Wisconsin Republicans
Union (American Civil War) state governors
Wisconsin Whigs
19th-century American politicians
Republican Party governors of Wisconsin
American male journalists
19th-century American male writers
United States politicians killed during the Civil War
People from Clinton, Rock County, Wisconsin
Western Reserve Academy alumni